Croatia–Denmark relations refers to the current and historical relations between Croatia and Denmark. Relations between the two countries are described as "excellent", "friendly" and "well-developed".

Croatia has an embassy in Copenhagen and an honorary consulate in Aarhus, while Denmark has an embassy in Zagreb and  3 honorary consulates in Dubrovnik, Rijeka, and Split.

Denmark actively supported Croatian accession to the European Union and NATO, with its officials stating that Croatia was the 28th EU member way before that became official in 2013. Today, both countries are full members of the European union, NATO, OSCE, the Council of Europe and the World Trade Organization.

Following Croatian independence from SFR Yugoslavia, Denmark recognized Croatia on 15 January 1992, while the diplomatic relations were established on 2 January 1992. Since then two countries have signed 26 treaties.

In 2005 Denmark launched a program in Croatia with aim to contribute to the development of the public administration. Focus was on establishing capacity building. Denmark assisted with 13,5 million DKK.

In 2012 Croatia exported $39,6 million worth goods to Denmark and imported from it $110 million worth goods.

On October 21, 2014 Queen Margrethe II awarded Croatian president Ivo Josipović with Order of the Elephant, the highest order of Denmark.

In June 2015 Denmark-Croatian relations received increased attention after a Danish citizen Ulrik Grøssel Haagensen was arrested by the Croatian police in the no-man's-land known as 'Liberland' between Croatia and Serbia. Grøssel Haagensen was taken across the Croatian border and placed in house arrest for 5 days before being sentenced to 15 days of prison, triggering protests in Denmark.

Croatia and Denmark are the scheduled hosts of the 2025 World Men's Handball Championship (alongside Norway).
Denmark gave full support to Croatia's membership in the European Union and NATO.

Diplomacy

Republic of Croatia
Copenhagen (Embassy)

Kingdom of Denmark
Zagreb (Embassy)

See also 
 Foreign relations of Croatia 
 Foreign relations of Denmark
 Croatia in the European Union

References

External links

 
Denmark
Bilateral relations of Denmark